Jamnagar North is one of the 182 Legislative Assembly constituencies of Gujarat state in India. It is part of Jamnagar district and it came into existence after 2008 delimitation.

This assembly seat represents the following segments,

 Jamnagar Taluka (Part) – Navagam Ghed (M).
 Jamnagar Taluka (Part) – Jamnagar Municipal Corporation (Part) Ward No.-1, 2, 3, 4, 5, Jamnagar (OG) 18, Jamnagar Port Area 19

Members of Legislative Assembly

Election results

2022

2017

2012

See also
 List of constituencies of Gujarat Legislative Assembly
 Jamnagar district

References

External links
 

Assembly constituencies of Gujarat
Jamnagar district